Ascension Cathedral may refer to:

Ascension Cathedral, Almaty
Ascension Cathedral, Novocherkassk
Ascension Cathedral, Novosibirsk
Ascension Cathedral, Satu Mare, Romania
Ascension Cathedral, Tver
Ascension Greek Orthodox Cathedral of Oakland
Ascension Convent in the Moscow Kremlin (demolished)
Ascension of the Lord Cathedral, Târgu Mureș
Co-Cathedral of the Ascension of the Lord, Kecskemét, Hungary
Patriarchal Cathedral of the Holy Ascension of God, Veliko Tarnovo
Sophia Cathedral (Ascension Cathedral), Tsarskoe Selo